The Wairakei Power Station is a geothermal power station near the Wairakei Geothermal Field in New Zealand. Wairakei lies in the Taupo Volcanic Zone.

History 
The power station was built in 1958, the first of its type (wet steam) in the world, and it is currently owned and operated by Contact Energy. A binary cycle power plant was constructed in 2005 to use lower-temperature steam that had already gone through the main plant. This increased the total capacity of the power station to 181MW. The Poihipi Power Station was built in 1996 at a nearby site in the same field.

Units
Wairakei A station
 Unit 1 – 11.2 MW intermediate pressure
 Unit 4 – 11.2 MW intermediate pressure
 Unit 7 – 11.2 MW low pressure
 Unit 8 – 11.2 MW low pressure
 Unit 9 – 11.2 MW low pressure
 Unit 10 – 11.2 MW low pressure

Units 2, 3, 5 and 6 were decommissioned in 1984.

Wairakei B station
Unit 11 – 30 MW intermediate/low pressure
Unit 12 – 30 MW intermediate/low pressure
Unit 13 – 30 MW intermediate/low pressure

Wairakei Unit 14 – 4 MW intermediate/low pressure

Wairakei Binary Plant – 14 MW binary

Effects 

The use of steam from the field has had a number of visible effects on the local environment. Visible geothermal activity has increased (due to changes in the water table / water pressure allowing more steam to be created underground, upsurging at places like Craters of the Moon), while there has also been some land subsidence and reduction in steam volumes from the field after some decades of use. Recent total electrical production has been sustained or increased with the investment in additional power stations such as the binary plant of 2005 designed for lower-temperature generation, but the total still does not reach the early power levels such as the 192MW reported in 1965 (NZED Annual Statistics), for instance. Some power stations in the field are now capped in their extraction capacities and a substantial part of the water / steam is being reinjected after use.

The hot geothermal fluid that is extracted is originally cold rainwater that had percolated downwards and been heated by hot rock; pumping back the warm water that emerges from the exhaust of the generator system thus reduces the heat drawn from the ground. The majority of arsenic in the Waikato River comes from the geothermal power station with the concentration reaching 0.035 grams of arsenic per cubic metre in certain places. The amount of arsenic gradually declines as the river flows northwards and is at its lowest at the Waikato River Heads.

Transmission 

Also at Wairakei is a major electrical substation, owned by the national grid operator Transpower. The substation is a major switching point for the Central North Island, and is responsible for connecting more than half the country's geothermal power stations, several hydroelectric power stations, the electricity supply to the entire Hawke's Bay and Gisborne regions and half of the Bay of Plenty region. A 33 kV connection at the substation supplies Unison Networks' Taupo distribution network.

See also 

 Geothermal power in New Zealand
 Electricity sector in New Zealand

References

Further reading

External links 
 New Zealand Geothermal Association - Wairakei Power Station information page

Geothermal power stations in New Zealand
Taupō District
Buildings and structures in the Taupo District